Mohamed Mrad (born on September 15, 1990, in Tunis) is a Tunisian actor and model, best known for his role of Mahdi Ben Salem in the Television series Naouret El Hawa.

Early life and education 
Born on September 15, 1990, in Tunis, he studied at the Carthage High Commercial Studies Institute in Tunis.

Career 
In 2013 was his first experience in the television soap opera "Layem" the popular soap opera of Ramadan 2013 in which he played the role of Skander, a wealthy young man with a bad boy character.

In December 2014, he made the cover of the people magazine Tunivisions. Mrad is also known for his role in "L'Enfant du soleil" by Taïeb Louhichi and "Fausse note" by Majdi Smiri.

He is best known for his role of Mahdi Ben Salem in the Television series Naouret El Hawa.

In 2015, Mohamed Mourad participated in Arab Casting.

In 2019, Mohamed Mrad played the role of a police officer in charge of investigating a case that will plunge into a love relationship and into the world of politics in the television series "L'affaire 460" by Majdi Smiri, which was filmed in Russia.

Filmography

Cinema 
 2012: False Note by Majdi Smiri
 2014: Toefl Al-Shams (The Sun's Kid)  by Taieb Louhichi : Fafou
 2015: Dicta Shot by Mokhtar Ladjimi
 2016: Woh ! by Ismahane Lahmar : Selim

Television 

 2013: Layem by Khaled Barsaoui : Skander
 2014: Talaa Wala Habet by Majdi Smiri : Youri
 2014-2015: Naouret El Hawa by Madih Belaid : Mahdi Ben Salem
 2015: Bolice 2.0  by Majdi Smiri : Mohannad (invité d'honneur)
 2015 & 2017: Sultan Achour 10  by Djaâfar Gacem : Djawed
 2016: Al Akaber by Madih Belaid : Mohamed Al Othmani
 2016-2017: Flashback by Mourad Ben Cheikh : Walid
 2018: Tej El Hadhra by Sami Fehri : Kacem
 2019: The Affair 460 by Majdi Smiri : Youssef Ismail
 2019 + 2021: Machair (Feelings) by Muhammet Gök : Mourad

TV Shows
2015 :
Dbara Tounsia avec Hana Fehri on El Hiwar El Tounsi
Romdhane Showtime on Mosaique FM with Aicha Attia, Ali Bennour, Najla Ben Abdallah et Hédi Zaiem
2016 : Arab Casting (ar) on Abu Dhabi TV : candidate
2018 : Hkayet Tounsia (Tunisian Stories) on El Hiwar El Tounsi : Guest of Episode 3 of Season 3
2019 : Abdelli Showtime of Lotfi Abdelli on Attessia TV : Guest of Episode 4 of season 3
2020 : Labès (We're Fine) (season 9) of Naoufel Ouertani on Attessia TV
2021 : Dari Darek (our Home is yours) of Amel Smaoui on YouTube Channel of Radio IFM : Guest of Episode 58 of the web-show

Videos 

 2014: Commercial Ma Äadech Bekri (It is late) for the subscriptions in the Electroal Lists, realised by Tunistudio
 2015: Commercial for the association Tuniespoir, realised by Madih Belaid
 2017: Music video Yama Lasmar Douni by Asma Othmani

References

External links 
 
 

1990 births
Living people
Tunisian male television actors
Tunisian male film actors
Carthage High Commercial Studies Institute alumni
People from Tunis